John F. Saladino is an American interior designer, furniture designer, and garden designer, based in New York City.

He was born in Kansas City, Missouri. He graduated from Notre Dame and the Yale School of Art and Architecture.

Career
After graduation he worked with Italian architect Piero Sartogo in Rome.

Saladino established the Saladino Group, Inc. in 1972 in New York City.

His practice has a staff of around 30 and has undertaken office and residential design projects.

The design studio has completed numerous residential and corporate interior design projects, most of which draw heavily from traditional European influences. As well as undertaking interior design projects his practice also designs furniture.

His designs have appeared in Dunbar, Bloomingdale's, and Baker Furniture.

Saladino purchased a historic 1920s stone villa and estate grounds, located in Montecito, California, in 2001. His restoration project there involved reconstruction, new construction, interior design, and landscape design. It was completed in 2004.  Villa is his well illustrated book about the project.

Boards
He has served as a board member for a number of organizations, including Parsons School of Design, New York School of Interior Design, Save Venice, and the Sir John Soane Museum Foundation in London.

Books
Style by Saladino—by John Saladino, published by Frances Lincoln in October 2000.
 Villa—by John Saladino, published by  Frances Lincoln in March 2009.

See also

References

American interior designers
American furniture designers
American landscape and garden designers
Design writers
Year of birth missing (living people)
Living people
Businesspeople from New York City
Yale University alumni
People from Kansas City, Missouri
People from Montecito, California
American male non-fiction writers
21st-century American non-fiction writers
21st-century American male writers